Anthony Nathaniel Davis (born October 11, 1989) is a former American football offensive tackle. He played college football at Rutgers University and was drafted by the San Francisco 49ers in the first round of the 2010 NFL Draft.

High school career
Davis attended Piscataway Township High School in New Jersey, where he played for the Piscataway Chiefs high school football team. He was a three-year starter and recorded more than 70 pancake blocks for his career. In his sophomore season, Davis was a teammate to fellow NFL players Kyle Wilson, and Malcolm Jenkins and helped the team to an undefeated season, and its third consecutive state title.  Davis played in the U.S. Army All-American Bowl and was earned First-team All-American honors by USA Today.

Considered a four-star recruit by Rivals.com, Davis was listed as the No. 1 offensive tackle  prospect in the nation. He was also listed as the top prospect coming out of high school in the nation.  He was also regarded as the top prospect from New Jersey and received over 50 scholarship offers, he chose Rutgers over Ohio State, becoming the first No. 1 prospect from New Jersey to sign with head coach Greg Schiano at Rutgers, and the highest rated since Nate Robinson in 2003.

College career
In his freshman year at Rutgers, Davis played in all 13 games on the year. He was named starting right guard for the sixth game of the season and started the final eight games of the 2007 season. He earned First-team Freshman All-American honors by the Football Writers Association of America, The Sporting News and Rivals.com, and Second-team All-American laurels from Scout.com.

Davis was moved to left tackle before the 2008 season, and started 12 games at that position. He was named to the Second-team All-Big East by the league's head coaches and a First-team All-Big East honoree by the media.

In 2009, Davis was First-team All-Big East and Second-team All-America.

Professional career
After the 2009 St. Petersburg Bowl, Davis said on the field that he scheduled a news conference for December 22, to announce his NFL plans. At that news conference, he declared his intentions to enter the 2010 NFL Draft, and said he would hire an agent.

Davis was drafted with the 11th overall pick by the San Francisco 49ers after the 49ers traded up from the 13th overall pick with the Denver Broncos in order to select Davis. On July 30, 2010, Davis signed a five-year contract worth $37.5 million, with $15.95 million guaranteed.

At the end of the 2012 season, Davis and the 49ers appeared in Super Bowl XLVII. He started in the game, but the 49ers fell to the Baltimore Ravens by a score of 34–31.

On June 5, 2015, Davis announced he would not be playing during the 2015 season, stating he wanted time to "let his brain and body heal". He vowed a return after the break, however, claiming he wanted to return as the best right tackle in the league. On July 25, 2016, Davis filed reinstatement paperwork aiming to return to the team by the start of training camp. On July 30, Davis was officially reinstated by the league and re-joined the 49ers in time for their training camp. On September 26, 2016, Davis announced his decision to retire again from the league, and was subsequently placed on the reserve/left squad list.

On May 3, 2019, he applied for reinstatement from retirement. On May 28, 2019, he was released from the 49ers' reserve/left squad list.

References

External links
 San Francisco 49ers profile
 

1989 births
Living people
African-American players of American football
American football offensive tackles
American football offensive guards
Rutgers Scarlet Knights football players
San Francisco 49ers players
People from Piscataway, New Jersey
Piscataway High School alumni
Players of American football from New Jersey
Sportspeople from Middlesex County, New Jersey
21st-century African-American sportspeople
20th-century African-American people